Positive Energy is the 17th studio album released in 2015 by Ivory Coast reggae artist Alpha Blondy and The Solar System under the VP Records.

Track listing

Track 1 Featuring, Lead Vocals – Ijahman Levi, Track 2 Featuring, Lead Vocals – Tarrus Riley, Track 3 Featuring, Vocals – Assim & Naoufel, Ismaël Isaac, Track 8 Featuring, Vocals – Pierrette Adams, Track 9 Featuring, Vocals – Jacob Desvarieux

Personnel
Alpha Blondy – lead vocals
Loran Romain – Keyboards
Eddy Delomenie – Saxophone
Veron "Koxx" Dinnall – Bass 
Charles Laubé – Drums

References

2015 albums
Alpha Blondy albums